Anthony "T. J." Cunningham Jr. (October 24, 1972 – February 18, 2019) was a safety in the National Football League, playing for the Seattle Seahawks in 1996. Cunningham decided to retire after only one season. He played college football for Colorado.

Early life and education 
Cunningham was born in Aurora, Colorado. He graduated from Overland High School. 

After his star football career in high school, Cunningham attended college at the University of Colorado Boulder, playing football there as well.

Career

Athletic career 
Cunningham was drafted by the Seattle Seahawks in the 6th round (209th overall) of the 1996 NFL Draft. That year, Cunningham played in nine games before injuring his knee against the Oakland Raiders. He was released on August 25, 1997 after being placed on the physically unable to perform list a week prior.

After football 
After his playing career, Cunningham returned to his hometown and worked at William C. Hinkley High School, part of Aurora Public Schools, as its assistant principal.

Death 
On February 17, 2019, Cunningham was shot at Eaglecrest High School in Arapahoe County by a neighbor following an ongoing dispute over a parking space. He had met with the suspect, Marcus Johnson, at the parking lot to "box it out", when Johnson shot him three times. He died the following day as a result of his injuries. Johnson is being charged with first-degree murder.

References

External links
 databaseFootball.com

1972 births
2019 deaths
Deaths by firearm in Colorado
Sportspeople from Aurora, Colorado
Players of American football from Colorado
Educators from Colorado
American football safeties
Colorado Buffaloes football players
Seattle Seahawks players
People murdered in Colorado
American murder victims
Male murder victims